The 2009 Norwegian Figure Skating Championships was held in Bergen from January 15 to 17, 2009. Skaters competed in the discipline of single skating. The results were used to choose the teams to the 2009 World Championships, the 2009 European Championships, the 2009 Nordic Championships, and the 2009 World Junior Championships.

Senior results

Ladies

External links
 results

Norwegian Figure Skating Championships
Norwegian Figure Skating Championships, 2009
2009 in Norwegian sport